The black-necked grebe or eared grebe (Podiceps nigricollis) is a member of the grebe family of water birds. It was described in 1831 by Christian Ludwig Brehm. There are currently three accepted subspecies, including the nominate subspecies. Its breeding plumage features a distinctive ochre-coloured plumage which extends behind its eye and over its ear coverts. The rest of the upper parts, including the head, neck, and breast, are coloured black to blackish brown. The flanks are tawny rufous to maroon-chestnut, and the abdomen is white. When in its non-breeding plumage, this bird has greyish-black upper parts, including the top of the head and a vertical stripe on the back of the neck. The flanks are also greyish-black. The rest of the body is a white or whitish colour. The juvenile has more brown in its darker areas. The subspecies californicus can be distinguished from the nominate by the former's usually longer bill. The other subspecies, P. n. gurneyi, can be differentiated by its greyer head and upper parts and by its smaller size. P. n. gurneyi can also be told apart by its lack of a non-breeding plumage. This species is present in parts of Africa, Eurasia, and the Americas.

The black-necked grebe uses multiple foraging techniques. Insects, which make up the majority of this bird's diet, are caught either on the surface of the water or when they are in flight. It occasionally practices foliage gleaning. This grebe dives to catch crustaceans, molluscs, tadpoles, and small frogs and fish. When moulting at saline lakes, this bird feeds mostly on brine shrimp. The black-necked grebe makes a floating cup nest on an open lake. The nest cup is covered with a disc. This nest is located both in colonies and by itself. During the breeding season, which varies depending on location, this species will lay one (sometimes two) clutch of three to four eggs. The number of eggs is sometimes larger due to conspecific brood parasitism. After a 21-day incubation period, the eggs hatch, and then the nest is deserted. After about 10 days, the parents split up the chicks between themselves. After this, the chicks become independent in about 10 days, and fledge in about three weeks.

Although it generally avoids flight, the black-necked grebe travels as far as  during migration. In addition, it becomes flightless for two months after completing a migration to reach an area where it can safely moult. During this moult, the grebe can double in weight. The migrations to reach these areas are dangerous, sometimes with thousands of grebe deaths. In spite of this, it is classified as a least concern species by the International Union for Conservation of Nature (IUCN). It is likely that this is the most numerous grebe in the world. There are potential threats to it, such as oil spills, but these are not likely to present a major risk to the overall population.

Taxonomy
This species was first described by Carl Ludwig Hablitz in 1783 as Colymbus caspicus, from a bird in Bandar-e Anzali. This was originally thought to be a synonym for the horned grebe, until Erwin Stresemann discovered that the description applied more to the black-necked grebe in 1948. Before this, the earliest description was thought to be by Christian Ludwig Brehm in 1831, who gave this bird its current scientific name of Podiceps nigricollis from a German bird. To resolve this, the International Commission on Zoological Nomenclature suppressed the name C. caspicus. The genus name Dytes is sometimes used for this species, a placement which was formalized by Robert Ridgway in 1881.

This bird is closely related to the silvery grebe and the Junin grebe. The extinct Colombian grebe is sometimes considered to be a subspecies of this species, in addition to three other extant subspecies:
 P. n. nigricollis – (Brehm, CL, 1831): nominate, is found from western Europe to western temperate Asia (wintering to the south and west), in central and eastern Asia, and in eastern Africa
 P. n. gurneyi – (Roberts, 1919): is found in southern Africa
 P. n. californicus – (Heermann, 1854): is found from southwestern Canada through the western U.S. It winters as far south as Guatemala

The generic name, Podiceps, comes from two Latin words: podicis, meaning "vent" or "anus" and pes meaning "foot". This is a reference to the attachment point of the bird's legs—at the extreme back end of its body. The specific epithet nigricollis is Latin for "black-necked": niger means "black" and collis means "neck". The subspecies epithet californicus comes from "California", while gurneyi comes from the name of British ornithologist John Henry Gurney Sr.

"Black-necked grebe" has been designated the official name by the International Ornithological Committee (IOC). Both common names for this species refer to features visible when the bird is in its breeding plumage; in such plumage, it has an all-black neck and a spray of golden plumes on each side of its head. The name "eared grebe" is nearly a century older than the name "black-necked grebe". The latter was first used in 1912 by Ernst Hartert, in an effort to bring the common name of the species in line with its scientific name. The name "eared grebe" is still used in North America to refer to this bird.

Description

The bird has a wingspan range of 20.5-21.6 in (52-55 cm). The nominate subspecies in breeding plumage has the head, neck, breast, and upper parts coloured black to blackish brown, with the exception of the ochre-coloured fan of feathers extending behind the eye over the eye-coverts and sides of the nape. This eye is mostly red, with a narrow and paler yellow ring on the inner parts of the eye and an orange-yellow to pinkish-red . Sometimes, the foreneck can be found to be mostly tinged brown. The  is blackish to drab brown in colour and has a white patch formed by the secondaries and part of the inner primaries. The flanks are coloured tawny rufous to maroon-chestnut and have the occasional blackish fleck. The  and abdomen is white, with an exception to the former being the dark tertials and the mostly pale grey-brown outer primaries. The legs are a dark greenish grey. The sexes are similar.

In non-breeding plumage, the nominate has greyish-black upper parts, cap, nape, and hindneck, with the colour on the upper portion of the latter being contained in a vertical stripe. The dark colour of the cap reaches below the eye and can be seen, diffused, to the ear-coverts. Behind the ear-coverts on the sides of the neck, there are white ovals. The rest of the neck is grey to brownish-grey in colour and has white that varies in amount. The breast is white, and the abdomen is whitish. The flanks are coloured in a mix of blackish-grey with white flecks. The colour of the bill when not breeding differs from that of the breeding plumage, with the former being significantly more grey.

The juvenile black-necked grebe is similar to the non-breeding adult. There are differences, however, including the fact that the dark areas are usually more brownish in the juvenile, with less black. The  are often tinged pale grey, with whitish marks behind the eye. On the sides of the head and upper neck, there is a buffy or tawny tinge. The chick is downy and has a blackish-grey head with stripes and spots that are white or pale buff-grey. The throat and foreneck are largely pale. The upper parts are mostly dark grey in colour, and the abdomen is white.

The subspecies californicus usually has a longer bill compared to the nominate, and has brown-grey inner primaries during the breeding season. When not breeding, the nominate has diffuse and pale lores less often than Podiceps nigricollis californicus. The other subspecies, P. n. gurneyi, is the smallest of the three subspecies, in addition to having a greyer head and upper parts. The adult of this subspecies also has a rufous-brown tinge on its lesser wing-coverts. It also lacks a non-breeding plumage, in addition to the tufts on the side of its head being paler.

Vocalizations
When breeding, the black-necked grebe gives a quiet "ooeek" that ascends in pitch from an already high pitch. This call is also used as a territorial call, in addition to a low and fast trill, which itself is also used during courtship. Another call is a short "puuii" or "wit". This grebe is silent when it is not the breeding season and when it is feeding or resting.

Distribution and habitat
This species breeds in vegetated areas of freshwater lakes across Europe, Asia, Africa, northern South America and the southwest and western United States. After breeding, this bird migrates to saline lakes to moult. Then, after completing the moult and waiting for sometimes several months, it migrates to winter in places such as the south-western Palearctic and the eastern parts of both Africa and Asia. It also winters in southern Africa, another place where it breeds. In the Americas, it winters as far south as Guatemala, although the wintering population there is mainly restricted to islands in the Gulf of California, the Salton Sea, and Baja California. When not breeding, its habitat is primarily saline lakes and coastal estuaries.

Behaviour
This grebe is highly gregarious, usually forming large colonies when breeding and large flocks when not.

Breeding
This species builds its floating nest in the usually shallow water of open lakes. The nest itself is anchored to the lake by plants. It is built by both the male and the female and made out of plant matter. Most of it is submerged, with the bottom of the shallow cup usually being level with the water. Above the cup, there is a flat disc. This grebe nests both in colonies and by itself. When it does not nest by itself, it will often nest in mixed-species colonies made up of black-headed gulls, ducks, and various other waterbirds. The space between the nests in these colonies is often . Whether it nests in colonies or not has an effect on the dimensions of the nest. It is suggested that rarely some pairs of this grebe will steward over multiple nests when in colonies.

Pair formation in the black-necked grebe usually starts during pauses in the migration to the breeding grounds, although it occasionally occurs before, in wintering pairs. This pair formation continues after this grebe has arrived to its breeding grounds. Courtship occurs when it arrives at the breeding lake. The displays are performed in the middle of the lake. There is no territory involved in courting; individuals used the whole area of the lake. When advertising for a mate, a black-necked grebe will approach other black-necked grebes with its body fluffed out and its neck erect. It closes its beak to perform a call, poo-eee-chk, with the last note only barely audible. Courtship generally stops at the start of nesting.

In the Northern Hemisphere, this bird breeds from April to August. In east Africa, the breeding season is at least from January to February, while in southern Africa, the breeding season is from October to April.

The black-necked grebe is socially monogamous. Conspecific or intraspecific brood parasitism, where the female lays eggs in the nest of others of their own species is common with nearly 40% of nests being parasitized on average. In terms of territory, this grebe will defend only its nest site.

This grebe lays a clutch, and sometimes two clutches, of three to four chalky greenish or bluish eggs. Nests that have been parasitized, however, will have two more eggs on average, even though the number the host lays is about the same no matter if it has been parasitized or not. The eggs, although initially immaculate, do get stained by plant matter that the nest is built out of. The eggs measure  on average and are incubated by both parents for about 21 days. The laying date of the eggs is somewhat synchronized, with birds in small colonies having the laying dates spread out by just a few days, compared to large colonies, where the laying date is spread out over more than 10 days.

After the chicks hatch, the birds will desert their nest. Even though the young can swim and dive during this time, they rarely do, instead staying on the parents' backs for four days after hatching. This behaviour is present in all grebes, and is likely to have evolved because it reduces travel costs, specifically those back to the nest to brood the chicks and give them food. After about 10 days, the parents split the chicks up, with each parent taking care of about half of the brood. After this split, the chicks are independent in about 10 days, and fledge in about three weeks.

When disturbed while incubating, this bird usually (just under 50% of the time) partly covers its eggs with nest material when the disruption is not sudden, but a bird with an incomplete clutch usually does not attempt to cover the eggs. When the disruption is sudden, on the other hand, the black-necked grebe usually (just under 50% of the time) does not cover its eggs. In comparison, other species of grebes cover up their eggs when leaving the nest. Predation is usually not the primary cause of egg loss, with most nesting failures occurring after the chicks have hatched. A major cause of this is the chilling of the young.

Feeding

The black-necked grebe forages mainly by diving from the water, with dives usually lasting less than 30 seconds. These dives are usually shorter in time when in more shallow water. In between dives, this grebe rests for an average of 15 seconds. When feeding on brine shrimp at hypersaline lakes, it likely uses its large tongue to block the oral cavity. It is hypothesized that it then crushes prey against its palate to remove excess water. It also forages by gleaning foliage, plucking objects off of the surface of water, having its head submerged while swimming, and sometimes capturing flying insects.

This grebe eats mostly insects, of both adult and larval stages, as well as crustaceans, molluscs, tadpoles, and small frogs and fish. When moulting at lakes with high salinity, although, this bird feeds mostly on brine shrimp. The behaviour of black-necked grebes changes in response to the availability of brine shrimp; bodies of water with more shrimp have more grebes, and grebes spend more time foraging when the amount of shrimp and the water temperature decreases.

The young are fed one at a time by the parents, with one bird carrying the young while the other feeds it. The young take food by grabbing it, with their beaks, from their parents, or by grabbing food dropped into the water. When a young bird cannot grab the food, then the adults submerge their bill into the water and shake their bill to break up the food.

Moult and migration
When breeding is over, the black-necked grebe usually partakes in a moult migration to saline lakes. It especially prefers lakes with large numbers of invertebrate prey, so it can fatten up while moulting and before going on its winter migration. Some birds, although, moult when on the breeding grounds, but most do not moult until the end of the moult migration. This migration is dangerous, with hundreds and sometimes thousands of birds being killed by snowstorms when traveling to places such as Mono Lake.

When it finishes its moult migration, this bird moults its remiges between August and September, which makes it unable to fly. This moult is preceded by an increase in weight. During the moult, the breast muscles atrophy. When the moult is completed, this grebe continues to gain weight, often more than doubling its original weight. This additional fat is used to power the black-necked grebe's overnight fall migration to its wintering grounds. The fat is most concentrated in the abdomen, second most in the thorax, and least in the chest. This bird usually starts its migration earlier when shrimp is more abundant and when the moulting lake is at a higher than average temperature. It generally leaves on a clear night with lower than average surface temperatures.

Movement

This grebe is one of the most inefficient fliers among birds. Generally, it avoids flying at all costs and reserves long-distance flight exclusively for migration. This is combined with the fact that this bird is flightless for two months of the year during its moult. In flight, the shape of this grebe is like a loon: straight neck, legs trailing, and wings beating often.

When diving, this bird pulls its head back and then arches it forward into the water, with the body following and a slight springing. The legs start moving only after they are underwater. When swimming on the surface of the water, the body of this grebe is relatively high, although none of the underparts are seen. The neck is held straight up in a relaxed manner, with the bill being held forward and parallel to the water. Each of the feet perform strong alternating strokes.

Disease
Large-scale deaths (such as 150,000 birds on the Salton Sea in 1992) from erysipelas, avian cholera, avian botulism, and West Nile virus have been recorded in the past. In 2013 at the Great Salt Lake, for example, there was an outbreak of West Nile virus which is among the largest recorded avian die-offs in the US. The cause of the outbreak and modes of transmission are unknown, but there has been speculation about the latter. Since West Nile virus is able to survive in brine shrimp (and, for a temporary time, water at specific temperatures), it is likely that grebes could have become infected by eating diseased shrimp and/or swimming in the contaminated water. It is also theorized that West Nile virus could be transmitted among grebes through contact with the excrement of an infected bird, possibly around bodies of water, communal nest sites, areas of cohabitating birds, etc. Avian cholera, another disease that can cause massive die-offs in this species, is transmitted by currently-unknown biotoxins and/or pathogens, as well as problems with feather waterproofing putting birds at risk.

Status
As of 2016, the black-necked grebe is classified as least concern by the International Union for Conservation of Nature (IUCN). The trend of the population is uncertain, as some populations are decreasing, whereas others are stable, have an uncertain trend, or are increasing. The justification for the current classification of this species is its very large population (estimated around 3.9–4.2 million individuals) combined with a large estimated extent of occurrence (about 155 million km2 (60 million sq mi)). This grebe is probably the most numerous grebe in the world.

Unknown biotoxins, pathogens, and the impairment of feather waterproofing can lead to hypothermia and avian cholera. Since this grebe usually winters on the coast, it is also vulnerable to oil pollution. Large-scale disease, such as avian cholera, could threaten the species. These and other factors, such as human disturbance, including collisions with power transmission lines, contribute to declining populations in certain areas. This species used to be threatened in North America by the millinery industry, which helped facilitate the hunting of the birds, and egg collectors. Although this is true, this grebe is hunted in the Gilan Province in Iran, for both commercial and recreational purposes. However, there is no evidence suggesting that these threats could result in a significant risk for the overall population.

References

Bibliography

External links

 Eared Grebe Species Account – Cornell Lab of Ornithology

black-necked grebe
Birds of Africa
black-necked grebe
Birds of Nepal
black-necked grebe
Holarctic birds